A post is a main vertical or leaning support in a structure similar to a column or pillar but the term post generally refers to a timber but may be metal or stone. A stud in wooden or metal building construction is similar but lighter duty than a post and a strut may be similar to a stud or act as a brace. In the U.K. a strut may be very similar to a post but not carry a beam.   In wood construction posts normally land on a sill, but in rare types of buildings the post may continue through to the foundation called an interrupted sill or into the ground called earthfast, post in ground, or posthole construction. A post is also a fundamental element in a fence. The terms "jack" and "cripple" are used with shortened studs and rafters but not posts, except in the specialized vocabulary of shoring.

Timber framing
Timber framing is a general term for building with wooden posts and beams. The term post is the namesake of other general names for timber framing such as post-and-beam, post-and-girt construction and more specific types of timber framing such as Post and lintel, post-frame, post in ground, and ridge-post construction. In roof construction such as king post, queen post, crown post framing. A round post is often called a pole or mast depending on its diameter thus pole building framing, or a mast church.

Post and strut names in traditional timber framing
Wall – A general term for a post in a wall.
Principal – A primary support. Principal is a general term meaning a "major" member often distinguished from "common" or "minor" members.
Angle – A historical name for a corner post.
Intermediate – A post in an exterior wall not at a corner.
Chimney – An intermediate post receiving its name from being near a chimney.
Interior – A general term for posts not in an exterior wall.
Arcade – A post located between an aisle and nave.
Aisle – same as arcade post.
Corner – Any post at the corner of a building.
Story – A post only one story tall as in "storeyed construction" also known as platform framing.
Prick – 1) Same as story post, a one-story post for extra support at a particular location; 2) In a roof truss a side post.
Ridge – A post extending from the ground or foundation to the ridge beam.
Samson – similar to a prick post or puncheon.
Puncheon: 1) A short, stout post may be identical to a prick post; 2) Puncheon may also mean a split log or heavy slab of timber with the face smoothed, used for flooring or construction.
Dragon – (rare) A corner post supporting a dragon beam in jetty framing.
Gunstock, jowled, flared, teasel (rare)  – A flared post, larger at the top than the bottom, most commonly found in the side walls but could be any location. Rarely a post may have an "integral bracket" which is a mid-post flair to carry a lower timber. The portion of a flared post extending upward at the top is called the upstand and one of the top tenons is called a teazle (teasel) tenon.
Jetty – A post supporting a jetty
Door –: A post framing a doorway.
Blade – A specific name for the post-like timber in cruck framing.
Cruck stud – The upright stud or post forming a wall, mounted on a cruck blade and held by a cruck spur.
Pile, piling – A post driven or set into the ground such as in earthfast, post in ground, or "posthole construction".
Stave – 1) Small, narrow pieces of wood used in a variety of ways; 2) Upright planks carrying a wall.; 3) Posts carrying a wall.

Post and strut names in roof framing
King – 1) (U.S.) A single, central post in a roof truss in tension between the rafters (top chords) and a tie beam (bottom chord), or 2) (U.S.) A short of the tie beam only supporting the rafters via struts. 3) (U.K.) A king post specifically carries a ridge beam otherwise is called a king strut. "King post" was formerly used to describe a crown post in the U. K., but no longer.
King pendant: A central, upright timber in a truss projecting below the lowest beam, "normally used with scissor beams".
Queen –  1) A pair of vertical posts in a roof system that are part of a truss, with a straining beam between and in tension holding up a tie beam or; 2) Two posts in a roof system not acting as a truss in the engineering sense and here in compression. Also called a queen strut.
Queen strut: 1)(U.K.) A queen post which does not carry a plate.; 2)(U.S.) A queen post not part of a truss in the engineering sense and in compression (a more modern definition than 2)in Queen Post above).
Lateral Queen – a pair of braced posts between a tie beam and collar beam.
Prince – A strut associated with a king post truss.
princess – A strut associated with a queen strut but shorter.
Crown – A post on a tie beam or collar beam carrying a crown plate.
Crown strut: A piece similar to a crown post but not carrying a plate.
Ashlar – or ashlar piece: Short post from a tie beam to a rafter near a masonry wall.
Purlin – A post supporting a purlin plate, may be plumb or leaning (canted).
Hammer – An upright in a hammer beam truss supported on the hammer beam in a hammerbeam roof.
Ridge – A historic type of post and lintel framing, the ridge post carrying a supporting ridge beam. See Ständerhaus#Firstständerhaus

Gallery

See also
Framing (construction) which details each of
Balloon framing
Platform framing
Walls
Newel post: A non-structural upright which supports a stairway handrail.

Notes

References
 Alcock, N. W.. Recording timber-framed buildings: an illustrated glossary. London: Council for British Archaeology, 1989.
 Boucher, Ward, ed., Dictionary of Building Preservation John Wiley & Sons, Inc.: 1996, NY
 Gwilt, Joseph. An Encyclopaedia of Architecture: Historical, Theoretical and Practical, 1867. Reprint. NY: Crown Publishers, Inc, 1982. Print.
 Harris, Richard. Discovering timber-framed buildings. 2d ed. Aylesbury: Shire Publications, 1979.
 Sobon, Jack A.. Historic American timber joinery: a graphic guide. Becket, Mass.: Published by the Timber Framers Guild, 2002.
 Sturgis, Russell, Sturgis' Illustrated Dictionary of Architecture and Building: an unabridged reprint of the 1901-2 edition. Mineola, N.Y.: Dover, 1989. 
 Russell, Terence M.. The Encyclopaedic Dictionary in the Eighteenth Century: Architecture, Arts, and Crafts. 1734. Reprint. Aldershot, England: Ashgate, 1997. Print.

Timber framing
Structural engineering
Structural system

de:Ständer
nl:Stijl (bouw)